Chahar Taq (also Romanized as Chahār Ţāq; also known as Chahar Tagh and Chehār Tākh) is a village in Shirin Su Rural District, Shirin Su District, Kabudarahang County, Hamadan Province, Iran. At the 2006 census, its population was 245, in 45 families.

References 

Populated places in Kabudarahang County